"Zaspal Pave" is a well-known Istrian folk song from Croatia. The title translates to "Paul fell asleep" in English. It is typically sung by two people, in the unique Istrian scale, without instrumental accompaniment.

Lyrics

Sources

Croatian folk songs
Istria